The Pointe des Genevois is a mountain of the Swiss Pennine Alps, overlooking Arolla in the canton of Valais. It lies just south of the higher summit of the Dent de Perroc.

References

External links
 Pointe des Genevois on Hikr

Mountains of the Alps
Alpine three-thousanders
Mountains of Switzerland
Mountains of Valais